Saint John the Evangelist and Michael the Archangel form a pair of 1518 oil on panel paintings by Pontormo. Each work was originally rectangular in format - the round opening was added in 1737 to accommodate a shrine with a crucifix. They hang in the church of San Michele Arcangelo in Pontormo in the artist's birthplace of Pontorme and may have originally been produced for its cappella del Crocifisso.

References

1518 paintings
Paintings by Pontormo
Paintings depicting Michael (archangel)
Paintings depicting John the Apostle
Paintings in Tuscany